The Grove Mountains are a large, scattered group of mountains and nunataks extending over an area of approximately , located  east of the Mawson Escarpment in American Highland, Antarctica. They were first photographed from the air by aircraft of U.S. Navy Operation Highjump, 1946–47, and named by the Antarctic Names Committee of Australia for Squadron Leader I.L. Grove, a Royal Australian Air Force pilot with the Australian National Antarctic Research Expeditions, who made a November 1958 landing in these mountains.

Features in the Grove Mountains

 Black Nunataks
 Bode Nunataks
 Bryse Peaks
 Cooke Peak
 Davey Nunataks
 Gale Escarpment
 Lamberts Peak
 Mason Peaks
 Melvold Nunataks
 Mount Harding
 Tate Rocks
 Truman Nunatak
 Watts Nunatak
 Wilson Ridge
 Vukovich Peaks
 Zakharoff Ridge

See also
Prince Charles Mountains

References

Mountain ranges
Mountain ranges of Antarctica
Landforms of Princess Elizabeth Land